The 1961 Nippon Professional Baseball season was the twelfth season of operation of Nippon Professional Baseball (NPB).

Regular season

Standings

Postseason

Japan Series

League leaders

Central League

Pacific League

Awards
Most Valuable Player
Shigeo Nagashima, Yomiuri Giants (CL)
Katsuya Nomura, Nankai Hawks (PL)
Rookie of the Year
Hiroshi Gondo, Chunichi Dragons (CL)
Toshiaki Tokuhisa, Kintetsu Buffaloes (PL)
Eiji Sawamura Award
Hiroshi Gondo, Chunichi Dragons (CL)

See also
1961 Major League Baseball season

References